the Shoots of Autumn Crops is an oil on canvas painting of 1908 by the Russian artist Zinaida Serebriakova. It was purchased by the Tretyakov Gallery in 1910.

References

1908 paintings
Paintings by Zinaida Serebriakova
Collections of the Tretyakov Gallery
Farming in art